Birmingham Bordesley was a borough constituency in the city of Birmingham, which returned one Member of Parliament (MP) to the House of Commons of the Parliament of the United Kingdom. Elections were held using the first-past-the-post voting system.

The constituency was created upon the abolition of the multi-member Birmingham seat in 1885 and abolished in 1918.

Boundaries 
Before 1885 Birmingham, in the county of Warwickshire, had been a three-member constituency (see Birmingham (UK Parliament constituency) for further details). Under the Redistribution of Seats Act 1885 the parliamentary borough of Birmingham was split into seven single-member divisions, one of which was Birmingham Bordesley. It consisted of the wards of Bordesley and St Bartholomew's.

The division was located in the south-east corner of the city, within its boundaries in 1885. To the west was Birmingham South, to the north Birmingham East, to the east Tamworth and to the south East Worcestershire.

In the 1918 redistribution of parliamentary seats, the Representation of the People Act 1918 provided for twelve new Birmingham divisions. The Bordesley division was abolished.

Members of Parliament 

Note: Broadhurst was an official Liberal MP who, as a leading Trade Unionist, was known as a Liberal/Labour politician. He was Secretary of the Trades Union Congress Parliamentary Committee (equivalent to the later office of General Secretary of the TUC) 1876-1885 and 1886–1890.

Elections

Elections in the 1880s

Elections in the 1890s

Elections in the 1900s

Elections in the 1910s

General Election 1914–15:

Another General Election was required to take place before the end of 1915. The political parties had been making preparations for an election to take place and by July 1914, the following candidates had been selected; 
Unionist: John William Dennis
Liberal: George Jackson

See also
List of former United Kingdom Parliament constituencies

References 

 Boundaries of Parliamentary Constituencies 1885-1972, compiled and edited by F.W.S. Craig (Parliamentary Reference Publications 1972)
 British Parliamentary Election Results 1885-1918, compiled and edited by F.W.S. Craig (Macmillan Press 1974)
 Who's Who of British Members of Parliament, Volume II 1886-1918, edited by M. Stenton and S. Lees (Harvester Press 1978)
 

Parliamentary constituencies in Birmingham, West Midlands (historic)
Politics of Warwickshire
Constituencies of the Parliament of the United Kingdom established in 1885
Constituencies of the Parliament of the United Kingdom disestablished in 1918